Ninth House is a paranormal fantasy novel by American author Leigh Bardugo, published by Flatiron Books in October 2019.

The first in a series, Ninth House was followed by a sequel titled Hell Bent, which was published in January 2023.

Premise
The novel follows unlikely Yale University freshman 20-year-old Galaxy "Alex" Stern, a high school drop out and homicide survivor who can see ghosts, called "Grays". Alex is mysteriously offered a full ride to university following her trauma despite her background and lack of qualifications. She attempts to navigate her new life at the Ivy League while tasked by her benefactor with monitoring the eight Houses of the Veil, secret societies that harbor dark occult magic and power, as a member of Lethe, the ninth house.

Background
The novel is Bardugo's first adult novel and, beyond the fantasy elements, is largely inspired by her time at Yale University. Bardugo first became inspired upon discovering the tombs of Yale's secret societies as she walked down New Haven's Grove Street during her freshman year. When her friend sent her pictures from their time at Yale years later, Bardugo was struck with memories, both pleasant and unpleasant, which inspired her to explore trauma for this novel but also companionship through it. The "ninth house" in the novel is based on the Anderson Mansion, the real-life New Haven headquarters of the Yale secret society Shabtai.

Reception
Award-winning horror author Stephen King called Ninth House "the best fantasy novel I've read in years, because it's about real people. Bardugo's imaginative reach is brilliant, and this story―full of shocks and twists―is impossible to put down." It also received endorsements from fellow authors Lev Grossman, Kelly Link, Joe Hill, and Charlaine Harris.

Accolades

Awards and nominations

Adaptation
On October 10, 2019, two days after the novel's release, it was announced Amazon Studios would adapt Ninth House as a TV series. Leigh Bardugo is set to executive produce the project alongside Pouya Shahbazian.

References

2019 fantasy novels
Crime novels
Dark fantasy novels
Novels by Leigh Bardugo
Novels set in Yale University
Flatiron Books books